The 2022 season was the Cincinnati Bengals' 53rd in the National Football League (NFL), their 55th overall, and their fourth under head coach Zac Taylor. After an 0–2 start, the Bengals quickly turned around, winning 12 out of their last 14 games to match their franchise best record of 12–4. The Bengals improved upon their 10–7 record from the previous season and the AFC North title for the second straight year. Cincinnati's Week 17 game against Buffalo was declared a no-contest after Buffalo safety Damar Hamlin suffered cardiac arrest, resulting in only 16 games played.

The Bengals defeated Baltimore 24–17 in the Wild Card round. The most notable play was a fumble recovery and 98-yard touchdown return by defensive end Sam Hubbard after linebacker Logan Wilson stripped the ball from Ravens quarterback Tyler Huntley on a quarterback sneak. The following week, the Bengals traveled to face Buffalo. Despite Buffalo's home-field advantage and snowy conditions, the Bengals prevailed 27–10. With the win, they advanced to the AFC Championship Game for the second consecutive year, a first in franchise history. The Bengals faced Kansas City in Arrowhead Stadium for a rematch of the previous year's contest and found themselves tied late into the fourth quarter. However, a personal foul penalty by the Bengals would aid a late Kansas City field goal attempt and the Bengals ultimately lost 23–20 to the eventual Super Bowl LVII champions.

Shortly before the beginning of the preseason, the Bengals renamed their stadium Paycor Stadium. The stadium had been named after the team's founder and first head coach, Paul Brown, since it opened in 2000.

Offseason

Free agents

Unrestricted

Restricted

Exclusive-Rights

Signings

Releases

Draft

Draft trades

Staff

Final roster

NFL Top 100

Preseason

Regular season

Schedule

Note: Intra-division opponents are in bold text.

Game summaries

Week 1: vs. Pittsburgh Steelers

The Bengals started the 2022 season against their division rival Steelers in Cincinnati. The Steelers scored first in the first quarter when Minkah Fitzpatrick returned an interception 31 yards for a touchdown to make it 7–0. The Bengals made it 7–3 when Evan McPherson made a 59-yard field goal which was the longest in franchise history. The Steelers then went ahead 10–3 after Chris Boswell kicked a 20-yard field goal. In the second quarter, the Steelers moved ahead 17–3 after Mitchell Trubisky found Najee Harris on a 1-yard touchdown pass. The Bengals drew closer at halftime when McPherson made a 26-yard field goal to make it 17–6. After the break, the Bengals came within 3 in the third quarter when Joe Burrow found Tyler Boyd on a 2-yard touchdown pass (with a successful 2-point conversion) to make it 17–14. In the fourth quarter, the Steelers moved ahead by 6 when Boswell kicked a 48-yard field goal to make it 20–14. Later on in the quarter, the Bengals tied the game when Burrow found Ja'Marr Chase on a 6-yard touchdown pass. (with a blocked PAT) to send the game into overtime tied at 20–20. After going back and forth on possessions, the Steelers managed to win the game when Boswell kicked the game winning 53-yard field goal with seconds left to make the final score 23–20.

With their 3-game winning streak against the Steelers snapped, the Bengals started the season 0–1.  Wins by the Browns and Ravens would leave them at the bottom of the AFC North.  Joe Burrow committed 5 turnovers throughout the course of the game (4 interceptions, 1 lost fumble).

Week 2: at Dallas Cowboys

Despite a fourth quarter comeback, the Bengals allowed the Cowboys to claim the win by marching down the field in the dying seconds of the game. With the loss, Cincinnati dropped to 0–2. This marked the third 0–2 start in four seasons, as well as the first team since the 2015 Seattle Seahawks to start 0–2 after playing in the Super Bowl the year prior. This also marked the first 0–2 start by a defending AFC champion since the 1999 Denver Broncos started 0–4 after winning Super Bowl XXXIII.

Week 3: at New York Jets

After a disappointing 0–2 start to the season, the Bengals bounced back with a win against the Jets. Trey Hendrickson had 2.5 sacks, including 2 forced fumbles, and Joe Burrow threw for 275 yards and 3 touchdowns with no interceptions, preventing an 0–3 start.

Week 4: vs. Miami Dolphins

On Thursday Night Football, the Bengals defeated the Miami Dolphins 27–15. The Bengals had a quick start, getting a touchdown in the first possession of the game from Joe Mixon. The Bengals defense also held the Dolphins offense to 1 touchdown.

Week 5: at Baltimore Ravens

In a primetime showdown on NBC, the Ravens won on a crucial 43-yard Justin Tucker field goal. With the loss, the Bengals dropped to 2–3.

Week 6: at New Orleans Saints

With 1:57 left on the clock and a 2-point deficit, Joe Burrow connected with Ja'Marr Chase for a 60-yard touchdown, essentially winning the game. With the win, the Bengals improved to 3–3 and returned to .500

Week 7: vs. Atlanta Falcons

The Bengals jumped out to a 28–17 halftime lead before scoring the only points in the second half to make it 35–17 and improved to 4–3.

Week 8: at Cleveland Browns

In the 2022 Battle of Ohio Round 1, the Browns made it an 11–0 halftime lead, scoring all the first half points in the second quarter.  After the third quarter, they had made it 25–0.  The Bengals finally got on the board in the fourth quarter, making it 25–6 by way of Joe Burrow's 13-yard touchdown pass to Tyler Boyd (with a failed PAT).  Though, the Browns scored again, making it 32–6 with Nick Chubb's 11-yard touchdown run.  Joe Burrow connected with Tee Higgins on a 41-yard touchdown pass for the final points of the game, making it 32–13.

The loss dropped the Bengals to 4–4. Joe Burrow's personal starting record against the Browns dropped to 0–4.

Week 9: vs. Carolina Panthers

The Bengals jumped out to lead 35–0 at halftime before the Panthers finally got on the board in the third with Baker Mayfield's 8-yard touchdown pass to Tommy Tremble, making it 35–7.  The Bengals made it 42–7 by way of Joe Mixon's 14-yard touchdown run.  The Panthers scored the remaining points in the fourth, making the final score 42–21.

The Bengals were able to go into their bye week 5–4, which was coincidentally the same record they had in the first 9 games on the previous season.

Week 11: at Pittsburgh Steelers

Coming off of their bye week, the Bengals traveled for Round 2 against the Steelers. In the first quarter, the Bengals scored first when Evan McPherson kicked a 45-yard field goal to make it 3–0. The Steelers then tied it up when Matthew Wright kicked a 42-yard field goal to make it 3–3. The Bengals then moved back into the lead when Joe Burrow found Samaje Perine on a 29-yard touchdown pass to make it 10–3. In the second quarter, the Steelers tied the game up at 10–10 when Najee Harris ran for a 19-yard touchdown. The Bengals then moved into the lead again when Burrow and Perine connected on a 11-yard touchdown pass to make it 17–10. The Steelers were able to tie it up at 17–17 when Kenny Pickett found George Pickens on a 24-yard touchdown pass. They took the lead at halftime 20–17 when Wright kicked a 30-yard field goal. In the third quarter, the Bengals retook the lead when Burrow found Trenton Irwin on a 1-yard touchdown pass to make it 24–20. The Steelers drew closer when Wright kicked a 34-yard field goal to make it 24–23. The Bengals then pulled away when McPherson kicked a 54-yard field goal to make it 27–23. In the fourth quarter, the Bengals scored a couple more times including a touchdown where Burrow and Perine connected for the third time on a 6-yard touchdown pass for a 34–23 lead and then McPherson kicked a 44-yard field goal to make it 37–23. The Steelers concluded the scoring of the game when Harris ran for a 1-yard touchdown. After a failed onside kick, the Bengals won with a final score of 37–30.

With the win, the Bengals improved to 6–4.

Week 12: at Tennessee Titans

After a close win, the Bengals traveled again to take on the Titans.  The game was tied at 10–10 at halftime.  In the third quarter, Evan McPherson kicked a 38-yard field goal to make it 13–10 Bengals before the Titans tied it up at 13–13 with Caleb Shudak's 24-yard field goal.  The Bengals moved up 20–13 when Joe Burrow connected with Tee Higgins on a 27-yard touchdown pass. The Titans countered with another 38-yard field goal by Shudak.  After getting stopped in the red zone, the Bengals kicked a field goal to make the score 23–16. However, a personal foul against the Titans took back the field goal and resulted into an automatic first down, ending the game and making the final score 20–16.

With the win, the Bengals improved to 7–4.

Week 13: vs. Kansas City Chiefs

The Bengals then went home to take on the 9–2 Chiefs.  After leading 14–10 at halftime, the Chiefs took a 17–14 lead in the third quarter by way of Isiah Pacheco's 8-yard touchdown run.  The Bengals then tied it up at 17–17 when Evan McPherson kicked a 36-yard field goal.  Patrick Mahomes then ran for a 3-yard touchdown to put the Chiefs back on top 24–17.  The Bengals scored the remaining points in the fourth quarter with McPherson's 41-yard field goal, making it 24–20 and taking the lead with Joe Burrow's 8-yard touchdown pass to Chris Evans. After a missed 55-yard field goal by Harrison Butker, the Bengals faced 3rd and 11. The Bengals converted, making the final score 27–24.

The Bengals improved to 8–4 with the win.  Joe Burrow's personal starting record against Patrick Mahomes improved to 3–0.

Week 14: vs. Cleveland Browns

Week 15: at Tampa Bay Buccaneers

With the win the Bengals have beaten all NFC South teams in 2022.

Week 16: at New England Patriots

With their seventh straight win, the Bengals improved to 11–4.  It became their first 7-game winning streak since 2015.

Week 17: vs. Buffalo Bills

The game was suspended with 5:58 remaining in the first quarter after an injury to Damar Hamlin, who was sent to the hospital in critical condition after suffering cardiac arrest and collapsing on the field. The NFL released a statement that said that the game would not be resumed during the week, and that the team's week 18 game would be played as scheduled. On January 5, the NFL announced the game would not be resumed and would be ruled a no-contest. It was the only time in NFL history that a regular season game has been canceled after starting and was never made up.

Week 18: vs. Baltimore Ravens

Standings

Division

Conference

Postseason

Schedule

Game summaries

AFC Wild Card Playoffs: vs. (6) Baltimore Ravens

The game started with a drive that ended with an Evan McPherson field goal making the game 3–0. However, Tyler Huntley threw an interception to Akeem Davis-Gaither which resulted into another Bengals drive that ended with a score, this time a touchdown to Ja'Marr Chase from Joe Burrow. The extra point was missed, making the game 9–0.  The Ravens bounced back from the early deficit however, with a touchdown to J. K. Dobbins that caused the score to become 9–7. Before Halftime, the Ravens got into the redzone, but were stopped short of the goal line, which forced them to settle for a field goal, making the score 9–10. After getting the ball back at halftime, the Ravens drive stalled, which eventually ended up into a Bengals touchdown from Joe Burrow rushing into the endzone. The Bengals went for two and scored with Tee Higgins after the touchdown, making the score 17–10. The Ravens responded with a burnt coverage play that resulted into a 41-yard touchdown by Demarcus Robinson, making the game 17-17. After a stalled drive by the Bengals, the Ravens got the ball back. Tyler Huntley ran for a 35-yard gain all the way to the Bengals two-yard line, with Jessie Bates making the touchdown saving tackle. Facing third and goal, Tyler Huntley attempted a diving quarterback sneak, but fumbled before he got over the endzone. Sam Hubbard caught the fumble and returned it 98 yards to the Bengals end zone, forcing the score to 24–17. After exchanging stalled drives, the Ravens made on final attempt to force the game to overtime. Facing a 4th and 20 with only 8 seconds left at the Cincinnati 27, Tyler Huntley threw a deep pass to the end zone. The pass was originally deflected, but James Proche failed to catch the falling ball, forcing a turnover on downs and winning the game for the Bengals.

AFC Divisional Playoffs: at (2) Buffalo Bills

AFC Championship: at (1) Kansas City Chiefs

Notes

References

External links
 

Cincinnati
Cincinnati Bengals seasons
Cincinnati Bengals
AFC North championship seasons